Allan Rowe (October 16, 1956 – March 16, 2015) was a Canadian politician, who was elected to the Nova Scotia House of Assembly in the 2013 provincial election. A member of the Nova Scotia Liberal Party, he represented the electoral district of Dartmouth South.

Personal life 
Rowe was born in Hamilton, Ontario. He attended McMaster University and, later Memorial University. Rowe lived most of his adult life on the East Coast, following his professional career.

He was admitted to hospital in late February 2015, after suffering an aneurysm while shovelling. He died on March 16, 2015, at the age of 58, leaving his seat in the legislature vacant.

Career 
Prior to his election to the legislature, Rowe was a longtime television news anchor on CJON-DT, CJCH-TV, ASN and CIHF-TV.

Politics 
In 2013, Rowe ran in the Nova Scotia general election for the Liberal Party of Nova Scotia in the riding of Dartmouth South. He won the election and was elected to legislature and served as the government caucus whip. Following Rowe's death, his duties as whip were reassigned to Brendan Maguire.

|-

|align="right"| 4,049
|align="right"| 46.24
|align="right"| +18.34
|-
 
|New Democratic Party
|Mary Vingoe
|align="right"| 2,918
|align="right"| 33.32
|align="right"| -22.24

|-
 
|Progressive Conservative
|Gord Gamble
|align="right"| 1,612
|align="right"| 18.41
|align="right"| +5.16
|-

|align="right"| 178
|align="right"| 2.03
|align="right"|  
|}

References

1956 births
2015 deaths
Nova Scotia Liberal Party MLAs
People from the Halifax Regional Municipality
Politicians from Hamilton, Ontario
Canadian television news anchors
21st-century Canadian politicians
McMaster University alumni
Memorial University of Newfoundland alumni